Tremblers are a New World group of passerine birds related to mockingbirds and New World catbirds. Like these, they are in the family Mimidae. There are 2-4 species in one genus, Cinclocerthia, which is endemic to the Lesser Antilles:

 Grey trembler (Martinique trembler), Cinclocerthia (gutturalis) gutturalis
 Saint Lucia trembler, Cinclocerthia (gutturalis) macrorhyncha
 (Southern) brown trembler, Cinclocerthia (ruficauda) ruficauda
 Northern brown trembler, Cinclocerthia (ruficauda) tremula

Among the living birds, they are apparently most closely related to the pearly-eyed thrasher.

Their common name comes from their peculiar behavior: if excited, they will show a much more exaggerated version of the wing-flicking also seen in other mimids such as the northern mockingbirds. The tremblers do not just flick their wings, but shake their entire bodies in a trembling motion.

Footnotes

References

 Barber, Brian R.; Martínez-Gómez, Juan E. & Peterson, A. Townsend (2004): Systematic position of the Socorro mockingbird Mimodes graysoni. J. Avian Biol. 35: 195–198.  (HTML abstract)
 Hunt, Jeffrey S.; Bermingham, Eldredge; & Ricklefs, Robert E. (2001): Molecular systematics and biogeography of Antillean thrashers, tremblers, and mockingbirds (Aves: Mimidae). Auk 118(1): 35–55. DOI:10.1642/0004-8038(2001)118[0035:MSABOA]2.0.CO;2 HTML fulltext without images

 
 
 
Endemic birds of the Caribbean
Taxa named by George Robert Gray